St. Michael's Association Football Club is a football (soccer) club, based in Tipperary Town, Ireland. The club, which was founded in 1947, plays in the Tipperary South District League (TSDL). Known colloquially as The Mickies, the club's most prominent success came in 1974, when St. Michael's won the FAI Junior Cup, a feat repeated by the club in 2013–14 and again in 2018-19 . The 2013–14 season proved to be an incredibly successful season for the Tipperary club as they won every trophy on offer, including the Munster Junior Cup. The club's home ground is Cooke Park, in Tipperary Town.

History
Since the early 1900s, Tipperary Town was a hotbed of footballing activity, with several teams operating in the town and its environs. Most notable among these was Tipperary Wanderers, who beat Shamrock Rovers 1–0 in the inaugural Irish Free State Cup (became FAI Cup in 1937) in December 1921. The tie was a qualifying round for the first-round proper, as Rovers were a non-league club at the time. The game had to be replayed as Rovers objected to the ground conditions and a dipped crossbar in one of the goals. Rovers won the second game 1–0, courtesy of a penalty kick scored by a young player who went on to become a League of Ireland legend, Bob Fullam. This turn of events proved all the more heartbreaking for Wanderers as Rovers progressed to the final, only losing out to St. James' Gate after a replay.

Tipperary United were also a well established club of the era, and enjoyed significant success up to the wartime period.

In 1947, a group of local football people established St. Michael's having received a letter from a Limerick party requesting a challenge match.

Home ground
From the inception of the club until 1985, St. Michael’s home pitch was the showgrounds at the rear of St. Michael’s Church in Tipperary Town. It was with this pitch as a base that the club first achieved major success by winning the Munster Junior Cup in 1973. Fame on the national stage came just one year later, with St. Michael's beating Dublin's Tolka Rovers, 2–1, to claim the FAI Junior Cup.

In 1985, the club moved the short distance to its present location at Cooke Park, which is held on a 99-year lease. This was done to facilitate the building of the nationally renowned Canon Hayes Recreation Centre, whose running track and playing pitch now occupies the site of the old St Michael’s pitch, and is now used by the club's schoolboy and reserve teams.

It hosted one game at the 1994 UEFA European Under-16 Championship, where Germany defeated Switzerland 5–1.

Cooke Park is widely recognised as one of the best junior grounds in Ireland, and has hosted three FAI Junior Cup finals, four Munster Junior Cup Finals, three FAI Youth Cup finals, three Munster Youth Cup finals, UEFA European U.16 championship internationals, Junior and Amateur  internationals, Lawyers World Cup and many local TSDL finals.

The Cooke Park facilities were used as a training base for the local special needs athletes for the Special Olympics, in 2003.

In 2005, the club installed a floodlit all-weather facility, and UEFA standard floodlighting on the Cooke Park pitch.

In August 2009, the Republic of Ireland senior international squad used Cooke Park for a training camp, in preparation for their friendly international games against Australia (12 August) and South Africa (8 September) in Thomond Park, Limerick.

Honours
To date the club have won every honour available to it at local, provincial and national level. These honours include the FAI Junior Cup, Munster Junior Cup, FAI Youth Cup, FAI U.17 Cup, MFA Youth Cup, Tipperary League and Cup at Junior and Youth level, the AOH Cup, and the Cork AUL League.

FAI Junior Cup 
St. Michael's claimed the biggest prize in Irish junior football for the first time in 1974, beating Tolka Rovers (Dublin) 2–1 in the final. For thirty years the club was the last club outside of Dublin to have won the trophy. The capital's monopoly on the competition was finally broken, ironically, by local Tipperary rivals, Clonmel Town in 1994, a game which was played in Cooke Park beating New Ross Celtic in the final.

The club appeared in a final of the competition for the second time in the 1999–2000 season, losing 2–0 to a strong Portmarnock side, in Tolka Park, Dublin.

Two years later, St. Michael's were competing in another Junior Cup final, against Fairview Rangers of Limerick. The venue on this occasion was Turner's Cross in Cork. A late St. Michael's equaliser saw the game end in a 1–1 draw. Fairview won home advantage for the replay on the toss of a coin and emerged as 4-2 victors, having come from two goals down.

In May 2014, St. Michael's won their second FAI Junior Cup after a 4–0 win against Ballynanty Rovers at the Aviva Stadium with goals from  David Slattery, Pat Quinn and two from Jimmy Carr.
St. Michael's qualified for the 2014 FAI Cup by reaching the semi-finals of the 2014 FAI Junior Cup.

Capped players
Several St. Michael’s players have represented Ireland at junior international level. Marty Hogan, Michael Grace, Davy Ryan, James Walsh, Paul Breen, Paul Tobin, Aaron Moroney, Kelvin Flanagan, Brian Buckley and Kevin O’Sullivan have all donned the famous green jersey. Walsh, who earned his 50th cap in January 2009, is the current captain of the junior international side, a role he has filled for several years.

Another former player, Shane Long, is currently starring for Premier League team Southampton and has been capped at senior international level. When earning his second cap as a substitute against Slovakia on 28 on March 2007, he became the first person to play both hurling and international football at Croke Park, having been part of the Tipperary team for the All-Ireland Minor semi-finals in 2003 and 2004. He was nominated for the Football Association of Ireland Young Player of the Year Award for 2007.

Alumni
On the administrative side former chairman and treasurer Tom Lewis has gone on to be chairman of the FAI Junior Council and former player and honorary life president John Delaney is currently CEO of the Football Association of Ireland.

Backroom team
The club have a hard working committee of fifteen members and have an average of seventy five players per season between first and second teams at both youth and junior level. The club also caters for hundreds of schoolboy players

Roll of Honour
North Munster League & Smyth Cup: 1948
Munster Junior Cup: 1973, 1990, 1991, 2001, 2005, 2011, 2014, 2016
FAI Junior Cup: 1974, 2014
FAI Junior Runners Up: 2000, 2002, 2010, 2011
FAI Youth Cup: 1994, 1995
Munster Youth Cup: 1991, 1992, 1994, 1995
Tipperary Premier League Champions: 13 times
Tipperary Cup: 4 times
Tipperary Youth League: 12 times
Tipperary Youth Cup: 8 times
Tipperary Third Division (B team): 1992
Paddy Purtill Cup: 2004

References

External links
Tipperary South District League Official Site

Association football clubs in County Tipperary
Former Cork Athletic Union League clubs
Association football clubs established in 1947
1947 establishments in Ireland